is a 2015 Japanese science fiction comedy film written and directed by Kōki Mitani. The film was released on October 24, 2015.

Plot

The film is set in 2265.

Cast
Shingo Katori
Haruka Ayase
Shun Oguri
Yūka
Takanori Nishikawa
Kenichi Endō

Kanji Ishimaru
Sayaka Akimoto
Kenji Anan

Development

Galaxy Turnpike was filmed at Toho Studios in Tokyo in March 2015.

Reception

References

External links
 

2010s Japanese films
2010s science fiction comedy films
Films directed by Kōki Mitani
Films set in the 23rd century
Films shot in Tokyo
Japanese science fiction comedy films
Films with screenplays by Kôki Mitani
2010s Japanese-language films
Toho films
Fuji TV